Selo is the name of several rural localities in Russia.

Modern localities

Arkhangelsk Oblast
As of 2014, three rural localities in Arkhangelsk Oblast bear this name:

Selo, Kargopolsky District, Arkhangelsk Oblast, a village in Khotenovsky Selsoviet of Kargopolsky District; 
Selo, Nyandomsky District, Arkhangelsk Oblast, a village in Limsky Selsoviet of Nyandomsky District; 
Selo, Verkhnetoyemsky District, Arkhangelsk Oblast, a village in Verkhnetoyemsky Selsoviet of Verkhnetoyemsky District;

Kostroma Oblast
As of 2014, one rural locality in Kostroma Oblast bears this name:

Selo, Kostroma Oblast, a village in Pankratovskoye Settlement of Chukhlomsky District;

Leningrad Oblast
As of 2014, one rural locality in Leningrad Oblast bears this name:

Selo, Leningrad Oblast, a village in Kalitinskoye Settlement Municipal Formation of Volosovsky District;

Novgorod Oblast
As of 2014, one rural locality in Novgorod Oblast bears this name:
Selo, Novgorod Oblast, a village in Dolgovskoye Settlement of Moshenskoy District

Oryol Oblast
As of 2014, one rural locality in Oryol Oblast bears this name:

Selo, Oryol Oblast, a settlement in Voronetsky Selsoviet of Trosnyansky District;

Smolensk Oblast
As of 2014, one rural locality in Smolensk Oblast bears this name:
Selo, Smolensk Oblast, a village in Dobrinskoye Rural Settlement of Dukhovshchinsky District

Vologda Oblast
As of 2014, three rural localities in Vologda Oblast bear this name:
Selo, Kalininsky Selsoviet, Totemsky District, Vologda Oblast, a village in Kalininsky Selsoviet of Totemsky District
Selo, Verkhnetolshmensky Selsoviet, Totemsky District, Vologda Oblast, a village in Verkhnetolshmensky Selsoviet of Totemsky District
Selo, Vozhegodsky District, Vologda Oblast, a village in Maryinsky Selsoviet of Vozhegodsky District

Alternative names
Selo, alternative name of Kazennoye Selo, a village in Samoylovskoye Settlement Municipal Formation of Boksitogorsky District in Leningrad Oblast;

See also
Selo, a general term for a type of a rural locality in Russia